Garter Colt (Giarrettiera Colt) is a 1968 Italian spaghetti Western directed by Gian Andrea Rocco. It is one of the rare Italo-Westerns with a woman as lead character and was shot in Sardinia at a town named San Salvatore di Sinis.

Plot 
At the Mexico–United States border, a brave young woman defends herself from the attack of the fearsome bandit, "Red", mastering a gun and the game of poker. Falling in love with a young Frenchman, he asks her to give up gambling and start a quiet and normal life, but when the young man is abducted by "Red", she is determined to seek revenge.

Cast 
 Nicoletta Machiavelli as Lulu, - Giarrettiera Colt
 Claudio Camaso (Claudio Volonté) as Red
 Marisa Solinas as Rosie
 Yorgo Voyagis as Benito Juarez/Carlos
 Walter Barnes as General Droga
  Gaspare Zola  as Emperor Maximilian/Jean
  Silvana Bacci 
  Franco Bucceri  as the Doctor
  Elvira Cortese  as Elvira
 James Martin as Sheriff
 Giovanni Ivan Scratuglia  as Roger

References

External links

Giarrettiera Colt at the Spaghetti Western Database

1968 films
Spaghetti Western films
1960s Western (genre) comedy films
Italian films about revenge
Films scored by Giovanni Fusco
Films shot in Sardinia
1968 comedy films
Italian Western (genre) comedy films
1960s Italian films